Noah Parker may refer to:
 Noah Parker (actor) (born 1998), Canadian-New Zealand actor
 Noah Parker (Atomic Betty character), animated character in the TV series Atomic Betty